One Exciting Night is a 1922 American Gothic silent mystery film directed by D. W. Griffith.

The plot revolves around a series of murders on a wealthy estate and the attempts of the cast to uncover the murderer's identity. The success of both the Mary Roberts Rinehart and Avery Hopwood play The Bat (1920), as well as the 1922 stage play The Cat and the Canary, led Griffith to write and produce his own variation on the theme, which in turn led to the production of similar "murder mystery/old dark house" films such as The Ghost Breaker (1922), previously filmed by C. B. DeMille in 1914, The Bat (1926) based on the 1920 play, Midnight Faces (1926), The Cat and the Canary (1927), The Old Dark House (1932) and even the fabled London After Midnight (1927) with Lon Chaney.

At the time of this film, Henry Hull was starring on Broadway in the stage version of John Willard's The Cat and the Canary.

Plot
Agnes Harrington's uncle separates her from her family in Africa when her wealthy father passes away, so that he won't have to share his brother's fortune with the child. Years later on his deathbed, he sees to it that Agnes is restored to her rightful place in society, cutting his own son John Fairfax out of the chain of inheritance in the process. John, Agnes and a number of other people gather at a social event at the famous Fairfax Estate, unaware that it is being used by a gang of bootleggers, and that a hidden treasure is concealed somewhere on the grounds. To make matters worse, a creepy madman is stalking the grounds, and one by one people start turning up dead.

Cast
 Carol Dempster as Agnes Harrington
 Henry Hull as John Fairfax
 Morgan Wallace as J. Wilson Rockmaine
 Margaret Dale as Mrs. Harrington
 Charles Emmett Mack as A Guest
 Charles Croker-King as The Neighbor
 Porter Strong as Romeo Washington
 Frank Sheridan as Detective
 Frank Wunderlee as Samuel Jones
 Grace Griswold as Auntie Fairfax
 Irma Harrison as The Maid
 Herbert Sutch as Clary Johnson
 Percy Carr as The Butler

Production
One Exciting Night saw an underwhelming response at test screenings. Director D. W. Griffith decided that the problem was that the film lacked the spectacular climax audiences had come to expect from his films, so he reassembled the cast and shot a new ending involving a terrifying storm, using a combination of real hurricane footage which he had shot earlier and studio footage filmed with special effects.

Home media
This film received a brief release on VHS in the 1990s. In March 2014 the film was released on all-region DVD by Alpha Video.

References

External links

Lantern slide at silenthollywood.com
advertisement poster

1922 films
1920s English-language films
American silent feature films
1920s comedy horror films
1922 horror films
1920s mystery films
American black-and-white films
Films directed by D. W. Griffith
American comedy horror films
American haunted house films
American mystery films
Films set in country houses
United Artists films
1922 comedy films
1920s American films
Silent comedy-drama films
Silent mystery films
Silent horror films
Silent American drama films
Silent American comedy films